El Tigre: The Adventures of Manny Rivera (sometimes shortened to El Tigre) is an American flash-animated television series created by Jorge R. Gutierrez and Sandra Equihua for Nickelodeon. It was the first Nicktoon to be animated with Adobe Flash after O'Grady, which was exclusive to The N. The first screening of the show was on January 19, 2007, in the first-ever Nickelodeon Creative Summit held in San Juan, Puerto Rico, as a special treat for the 60 exclusive attendees. A sneak peek of the series aired on February 19, 2007. The series had two runs on two different networks; Nickelodeon from March 3, 2007 to June 20, 2008, then Nicktoons Network from August 7 to September 13, 2008.

Premise
Set in the fictional crime-ridden Mexican-American metropolis of Miracle City, El Tigre follows the adventures of Manny Rivera, a 13-year-old boy with superpowers trying to choose between being good or evil. Manny's father is a superhero known as White Pantera and wants Manny to grow up to be good and fight evil. Manny's Grandfather is a supervillain known as Puma Loco who thinks Manny should go to the dark side.

Characters

 Manny Rivera/El Tigre (Alanna Ubach)
 Frida Suárez (Grey DeLisle)
 Rodolfo Rivera/White Pantera (Eric Bauza)
 Grandpapi/Puma Loco (Carlos Alazraqui)
 Maria Rivera/Plata Peligrosa (April Stewart)

Production
El Tigre was created by a husband-and-wife team named Jorge Gutierrez and Sandra Equihua along with others who were employed to make the show. The couple made the project from experiences they had when they were younger. Manny Rivera is based on Jorge's young self. Many things known in the show were based on actual events or parts of Jorge's life. His father was an architect (which was viewed as good) and his grandfather was a general in the military (which was viewed as evil). That idea was exaggerated to the idea of superheroes and supervillains. The city Miracle City is likely based on Tijuana, where Jorge grew up.

El Tigre's Decision of Destiny
On January 25, 2008, Nickelodeon allowed viewers to vote on the ending of an episode, deciding whether El Tigre's would choose the path of heroism or villainy. "The Good, the Bad, and the Tigre" premiered later that same day with the ending chosen by the voters. Voters ultimately chose the heroic ending, in which El Tigre defeated Django and Sartana. If the villainous ending had been chosen, he would have helped Django and Sartana conquer the world, but turned against them to take the empire for himself and Frida, and ruled over the world into old age.

Episodes

Home media
The complete series DVD was released as Season 1 on a six-disc set on November 23, 2011, as a manufacture on demand Amazon exclusive. It is also available to purchase on iTunes and Amazon Prime Video digitally.

Reception

Critical
Emily Ashby of Common Sense Media gave the series three out of five stars; saying that, “Tweens will enjoy the zany characters and exaggerated stories, but parents might take issue with the young characters' penchant for troublemaking, the absence of a strong role model for Manny, and the overall lack of repercussions for his questionable behavior.” The first season received an approval rating of 100% on review aggregator Rotten Tomatoes, based on six reviews.

Amid Amidi of Cartoon Brew wrote that "El Tigre offers hands down the most dynamic implementation of Flash I’ve ever seen in an animated TV series, seamlessly combining the cinematic possibilities more commonly associated with 3D CGI alongside the organic appeal of drawn animation," while also stating that the series has an "annoying tendency to stage too many scenes on slants and diagonals, voice acting performances that I couldn’t understand."

Awards and nominations

Other appearances
A videogame based on the series, also titled El Tigre: The Adventures of Manny Rivera, was released for the Nintendo DS and PlayStation 2 in 2007. El Tigre is a playable character in the Nintendo DS version of Nicktoons: Attack of the Toybots, and he also makes a non-playable cameo appearance in Nicktoons MLB. The series also had several internet browser-based games on Nickelodeon's official website, including a fighting game that could be downloaded through the Nick Arcade website, titled Festival De Las Piñatas. El Tigre was also a playable character in several Nickelodeon-crossover browser games, including Nick Arcade's Nicktoons HoverZone.

The characters Manny, Frida, and Grandpapi/Puma Loco make an appearance during a 2D animated scene in The Book of Life which is Jorge R. Gutierrez' first feature-length film. A wallpaper with El Tigre's design can be seen in a later scene as well as White Pantera in another scene.

El Oso (renamed as Bear Killah) appeared as a recurring character in Maya and the Three (also created by Jorge R. Gutierrez).

References

External links

 
 
 AnimationInsider.net Interview with Shawn Patterson, Composer for 'El Tigre'
 Interview with Jorge Guiterrez' co-creator of El Tigre.

 
2007 American television series debuts
2008 American television series endings
2000s American animated television series
2000s Nickelodeon original programming
American children's animated action television series
American children's animated adventure television series
American children's animated comedy television series
American children's animated fantasy television series
American children's animated superhero television series
American flash animated television series
Nicktoons
English-language television shows
Teen animated television series
Teen superhero television series
Television series about tigers
Annie Award winners
Emmy Award-winning programs
Fictional tigers
Hispanic and Latino American television